= Traum-Ferienwohnungen =

- Type: Subsidiary
- Industry: Vacation rentals
- Founded: 2001
- Founders: Nicolaj Armbrust; Sebastian Mastalka
- Headquarters: Bremen, Germany
- Area served: Europe
- Parent: OYO Vacation Homes
- Website: www.traum-ferienwohnungen.de

Traum-Ferienwohnungen is a German online marketplace for vacation rentals. Founded in 2001 by Nicolaj Armbrust and Sebastian Mastalka, the platform enables property owners to advertise holiday accommodation and communicate directly with guests.

Since 2019, Traum-Ferienwohnungen has been part of OYO Vacation Homes following OYO's acquisition of @Leisure Group.

== History ==
Traum-Ferienwohnungen was founded in 2001 by Nicolaj Armbrust and Sebastian Mastalka as an online marketplace for holiday rentals in Germany and other European markets.

In April 2016, @Leisure Group acquired a majority stake in the company. Following the acquisition, the founders continued to manage the business.

In 2019, OYO acquired @Leisure Group as part of its expansion into the European vacation-rental market. Through the acquisition, Traum-Ferienwohnungen became part of OYO Vacation Homes alongside brands including Belvilla and DanCenter.

== Business model ==
Traum-Ferienwohnungen operates a subscription-based marketplace for vacation rentals, allowing property owners to list accommodations and communicate directly with prospective guests.
